Hydrophilus piceus is a species of beetles in the family Hydrophilidae, the water scavenger beetles. This very large aquatic beetle is found in the Palearctic and is known by the common name great silver water beetle.

Description
This beetle is among the largest aquatic insects. The body of adults is black with a greenish or olive sheen. It has protruding eyes and reddish-black antennae.

Biology

This beetle lives in aquatic environments. In some regions it can be found in lakes and ponds. In Greece it can be found in lagoons and estuaries. In Great Britain it lives in ditches with thick vegetation in marshy areas.

The beetle is omnivorous but favors plant material. It can live for up to 3 years but most individuals die after breeding during their first year. The larvae feed on freshwater snails of the family Lymnaeidae, drilling holes into the shells to feed on the animals. The grubs can then reach 7 centimeters long before pupating in the mud. In the spring, the adult female spins a cocoon, fills it with eggs, and sets it afloat.

Distribution
This beetle is native to the western Palearctic realm, where it occurs throughout much of Eurasia, its distribution extending from Scandinavia to the Mediterranean, North Africa, and Russia, and as far east as India and China. Its distribution is not continuous because it has been extirpated from some areas; it is considered to be extinct in Norway and Luxembourg, for example. It is rare in some regions, being found only in specific and relictual habitat types.

References

External links

Hydrophilus piceus. Fauna Europaea.
 Bumblebee.org

Hydrophilinae
Beetles described in 1758
Beetles of Europe
Palearctic insects
Taxa named by Carl Linnaeus